Julio Peralta and Hans Podlipnik-Castillo were the defending champions but chose to defend their title with different partners. Peralta partnered Íñigo Cervantes but lost in the first round to Fabiano de Paula and Fabrício Neis. Podlipnik-Castillo partnered Max Schnur but lost in the first round to Marcelo Tomás Barrios Vera and Nicolás Jarry.

Barrios Vera and Jarry won the title after defeating Máximo González and Andrés Molteni 6–4, 6–3 in the final.

Seeds

Draw

References
 Main Draw

Challenger ATP Cachantún Cup - Doubles
2017 - Doubles